All Saints' Church, Sutton-on-Trent is a Grade I listed parish church in the Church of England in Sutton-on-Trent.

History
A Saxon church was listed in the Domesday Book. but was replaced by the current Norman building. The tower contains Saxon foundations and Norman herringbone work, the upper stages are 13th  and early 14th century respectively.  The Mering Chapel was built around 1525.

The current, Grade I listed church is
dedicated to All Saints. It can hold 350 persons and was repaired in 1848 and again in 1902-03and all the grave stones in the churchyard were moved to the edges some years ago and the graveyard was levelled.

The tower was rebuilt in the 1902-1903 renovations, and restored in 1932 by William Weir. The tower was further restored in 1956 - 1968.

It is part of a joint parish with:
St Matthew's Church, Normanton-upon-Trent
St Mary's Church, Carlton-on-Trent

Organ
The church contains an organ dating from 1911 by Henry Speechly. A specification of the organ can be found on the National Pipe Organ Register.

References

Church of England church buildings in Nottinghamshire
Grade I listed churches in Nottinghamshire
All Saints' Church